Coeroeni Airstrip  is an airstrip located near Kuruni (variant spellings: Coeroeni, Coeroenie, or Curuni) in Suriname. It was constructed as part of Operation Grasshopper.

Charters and destinations 
Charter Airlines serving this airport are:

Accidents and incidents 
 On 2 September 1960 a Cessna Bobcat UC-78C Bobcat, registration PZ-TAE from the Surinaamse Luchtvaart Maatschappij crashed at Curuni. There were no fatalities or injuries, the pilot was M. Wybenga.

See also
 List of airports in Suriname
 Transport in Suriname

References

External links 

OpenStreetMap – Coeroenie
OurAirports – Coeroenie

Airports in Suriname
Sipaliwini District